A parachute is a fabric device to slow descent through the air.

Parachute or Parachutes may also refer to:

Geography
 Parachute, Colorado, United States

Arts, entertainment, and media

Games
 Parachute (video game), an Atari 2600 game released by Homevision

Music

Groups
 Parachute (band), an American pop rock band
 Parachute Band, a worship band, formed out of the New Zealand-based Christian organisation Parachute Music

Albums
 Parachute (Guster album), 1994
 Parachute (Pretty Things album), 1970
 Parachutes (Coldplay album), 2000
 Parachutes (Frank Iero and the Patience album), 2016

Songs
 "Parachute" (Cheryl song)
 "Parachute" (Kaiser Chiefs song)
 "Parachute" (Otto Knows song)
 "Parachute" (Chris Stapleton song)
 "Parachute" (Timomatic song)
 "Parachute", by Kris Allen from Horizons, 2014
 "Parachute", by Something Happens from Stuck Together With God's Glue
 "Parachute", by Sean Lennon from Friendly Fire
 "Parachute", by Train from Save Me San Francisco
 "Parachute", by Laura Marano from Austin & Ally: Turn It Up
 "Parachute", by Timothy B Schmit from Expando
 "Parachutes" (song), by Charlie Simpson from Young Pilgrim
 "Parachutes", by Pearl Jam from Pearl Jam
 "Parachute", by Jolin Tsai from Butterfly
 "Parachute", by Timothy B. Schmit from Expando

Toys
 Parachute (BDSM), a sex toy
 Playground parachute

Other arts, entertainment, and media 
 Parachute (magazine), Canadian arts magazine
 Parachute music festival, a contemporary Christian music festival in New Zealand

Other uses
 Parachute (balloon), a hot air balloon
 Parachute (brand), a brand for a coconut-based hair product manufactured by Marico
 Parachute (drugs), a method of ingesting psychoactive drugs
 Parachute candidate, an election candidate who does not live in, and has little connection to, the area they are running to represent
 Parachute flare, a type of pyrotechnic that produces a brilliant light or intense heat without an explosion
 Parachute journalism, the practice of thrusting journalists into an area to report on a story in which the reporter has little knowledge or experience
 Parachute pants, a style of trousers